In mathematics, regularity theorem may refer to:
 Almgren regularity theorem
 Elliptic regularity
 Harish-Chandra's regularity theorem
 Regularity theorem for Lebesgue measure